This article covers the 2016–17 season for Korabi Peshkopi. They'll participate in the Kategoria Superiore and Albanian Cup.

Squad

First team squad
.

Transfers

In

Pre-season and friendlies

Competitions

Overall

Overview

Kategoria Superiore

League table

Results summary

Result round by round

Matches

Albanian Cup

References

External links
Soccerway

Korabi Peshkopi
Korabi Peshkopi seasons